The 1980–81 Allsvenskan was the 47th season of the top division of Swedish handball. 12 teams competed in the league. Ystads IF won the regular season, but Vikingarnas IF won the playoffs and claimed their third Swedish title. SoIK Hellas, Visby IF Gute and IFK Kristianstad were relegated.

League table

Playoffs

Semifinals
Ystads IF–HP Warta 19–19, 20–16 (Ystads IF advance to the finals)
Vikingarnas IF–LUGI 23–18, 19–22, 18–17 a.e.t. (Vikingarnas IF advance to the finals)

Finals
Vikingarnas IF–Ystads IF 21–15, 20–22, 26–22 (Vikingarnas IF champions)

References 

Swedish handball competitions